Kibiryovo is a rural locality (a village) in Petushinskoye Rural Settlement, Petushinsky District, Vladimir Oblast, Russia. The population was 197 as of 2010. There are 9 streets.

Geography 
Kibiryovo is located 7 km north of Petushki (the district's administrative centre) by road. Gribovo is the nearest rural locality.

References 

Rural localities in Petushinsky District